Sydney Park is a  recreational area in the inner-city area of Sydney, New South Wales, Australia. The parkland is located in the suburb of Alexandria, sitting along the borders with Newtown and Erskineville.

Sydney Park is the third largest park in inner-city Sydney. The park comprises large open recreation spaces with distinctive hills that provide 360 degree views over Sydney, a children's playground, wetlands, a sports oval (Alan Davidson Oval), a children's bicycle track, sculptures, a heritage area featuring the remains of the brickworks that formerly occupied part of the site, and the AIDS Memorial Grove. The former brickworks area of the park is listed on the City of Sydney local government heritage list.

History
Prior to British settlement, the north-western part of the present park area would have been a forest of turpentine and ironbark trees, grading down towards the south-eastern area, situated on Botany Sands, which would have been swamp, marsh and heathland associated with the waterway that became known as Shea's Creek. The woodland area was first cleared by Thomas Smyth, a marine sergeant with the First Fleet, who planted fruit trees and grain crops.

The north-west part of the park is situated over a bed of Wianamatta shale which became a valuable source of brick-making clay. Brick manufacture on the site was a major industry by the 1870s when machine manufacture was introduced. Bricks made here were widely used around Sydney's suburbs for more than 100 years and the first batch of machine-made bricks was used for the construction of the Farmers' Building on the corner of Market Street, Sydney. Josiah Gentle opened the Bedford Brickworks in 1893. In 1933, it was taken over by Austral Bricks, who had a large brickworks in Cowper Street, Marrickville. They operated the site until the brickworks closed in 1970. Their Marrickville site was closed down in 1983. Other parts of the Alexandria site were used for a variety of industrial purposes including manufacturing, warehousing and gas storage. The brickworks are registered on the City of Sydney local government heritage-list. They are also used by homeless people.

From 1948 to 1976, the massive clay pits that had been excavated were used as a municipal waste tip. After the closure of the tip, the area was reclaimed by placing layers of soil and building rubble over the refuse dump to create the present parkland profile.

Art and heritage
Sydney Park features public sculpture including Michael Snape's "The Trail" 1990 which is displayed on top of the hill in the north-western corner of the park, the corner opposite to St Peters railway station. This corner, where King Street, Newtown turns into the Princes Highway, features the remains of the chimneys and brick kilns from the old brickworks site.  These chimneys have been kept as heritage items and are a dominating feature of this area.

Sports and recreation
The Alan Davidson Oval is located in the northern section of the park. The oval is used for cricket and Australian rules football. It is the home ground of the South Sydney District Cricket Club and Newtown Swans Junior Australian rules football team.

The park is also the home of the St Peters Parkrun, a weekly free 5 km run, held every Saturday morning around the bike trails and paths of the park.

Culture and events

Sydney Park has played an important role in various youth subcultures since its redevelopment – generally without official approval. Throughout the 1990s and to the present day the park is used reasonably regularly for the 'Punks Picnic' – a gathering initially of anarcho-punks from Newtown and neighbouring suburbs. From 2006 to 2008, after organising a number Punks Picnics, Shaun South hosted the Summer Winds DIY music festival at the brick works site, where a plaque now commemorates the events. From 1992 to 1994 the park was also used by the Vibe Tribe for a series of free open-air rave parties that formed an important part of the Sydney electronic music scene throughout the 1990s. The last of these Freequency was violently shut down by over 40 riot police. Since then, in an effort to avoid such "anti-social behaviour" and illegal gatherings, the South Sydney Council (and now City of Sydney Council) has allowed and promoted community arts festivals on the site. In recent years, the park has become home to Sydney's Earthdance event, joining simultaneous dance parties in more than 50 countries to mark the International Day of Peace each September. The park has also become the host for the touring Soundwave Festival having its first show there in 2007 and returning in 2008.

Flora and fauna

The park area has been extensively replanted with a variety of native trees and shrubs. Stormwater retention ponds constructed in the eastern section of the site have been transformed into wetland habitats, partially recreating the original character of the eastern part of the site, and this has attracted a wide variety of bird and animal life including dusky moorhens, Australian magpies and pelicans. It has become a breeding place for black swans.

Gallery

References

External links

  [CC-By-SA]

Parks in Sydney
1991 establishments in Australia
Parks established in 1991
Alexandria, New South Wales
Newtown, New South Wales